Jackson Lee Nesbitt (June 16, 1913 – February 20, 2008) was an American printmaker, teacher, painter, and ad executive.

Biography
Nesbitt was born in McAlester, Oklahoma and worked for his father's printing business until 1931, when he enrolled in the University of Oklahoma, Norman. After two years in Norman, Nesbitt enrolled at the Kansas City Art Institute off and on from 1933 to 1941, working primarily with painter-professor Ross Braught, famed Regionalist painter Thomas Hart Benton and printmaker John de Martelly.  Though they were very different in age, Nesbitt and Benton were also friends who traveled and sketched together often—and the art they created was very similar. When financial necessity (in large part caused by the popularity of modernist art) forced Nesbitt to give up his art for a successful career in the advertising industry to provide for his family, Nesbitt did not speak with Benton for many years out of embarrassment. Nevertheless, Benton, and his wife Rita, always considered Nesbitt to be one of his finest students.

Artwork by Nesbitt appeared alongside fellow KCAI students James Duard Marshall and Gene Pyle in the 1937-1938 KCAI course catalog. In 1946, Nesbitt was awarded the Eames Prize by the Society of American Etchers.

Jack Nesbitt was an artist to his core. The fashion of the period may have made it impossible for him  to make a living from the sale of art but he had a wife and family to support. This meant using his talent in advertising for business clients eventually leading to the founding of his ad agency. He was his own graphic director but the career change never made Jack bitter.  He created calendars by day and fine art by night. Nesbitt sold his company after thirty years and in retirement, he again turned full time to art.

In the late 1970s the public began to pay more attention to American art of the 1930s and 1940.  Realism was once again in vogue and June and Norman Kraeft of June 1 Gallery in Bethlehem, CT were among those leading this revival.They visited with Nesbitt and bought all his remaining prints. They were also instrumental in introducing Jack to Mohammed Khalid a master printer in New York.  That led to the completion of an old etching whose plate had been etched in 1955. The success of Old Man with a Violin restarted Nesbitt's career

In 1988, he created his first new image in 33 years, Ozark Fatmer, and five other editioned lithographs before his death. Auction Barn created in 1989 is considered by many to be one of the great prints of the 20th Century.  Jack Nesbitt was married to his wife, Elaine for 64 years until her death in 2003. They had met at the Kansas City Art Institute where Elaine Thompson was a student in fashion design and had three children, Kathryn, Evelyn Slaine, & Thomas. Elaine designed hats that were favorites of Rita Benton.  The Thomas Hart Benton lithographs in the Nesbitt's collection were inscribed "to Elaine from Rita". Lithographs for hats!.

In October 1993 Stone and Press Gallery in New Orleans opened a retrospective exhibition of the graphic work of Nesbitt in New Orleans.  In tandem with the exhibition, Earl Retif and Ann Salzer published the catalogue raisonne of Nesbitt's work.

To prepare the catalog, the authors taped hours of the artist talking about each of his works, placing them into the context of his career.

Nesbitt and Associated American Artists 

Associated American Artists was instrumental in helping artists through their purchase and marketing of an entire edition of a specific image.  The AAA program contributed to helping  American artists support their families during the financial depression; it also made original art affordable for collectors.

In 1939 AAA contracted with Jackson Lee Nesbitt to offer Watering Place as one of its editions. The arrangements called for the printing of 250 images, 25 of which were reserved for the artist.  AAA paid $250 ($5400 in 2023 dollars) for the entire edition and then offered them to public at $5 ($106 in 2023 dollars) apiece. Nesbitt produced 4 other images for AAA,  Ozark Bridge, Evening in March, November Evening, and October Afternoon.

Nesbitt referred to Reeves Lewenthal, then Director of  AAA, as 
 “tighter than the bark on a birch tree.” 
Lewenthal wanted to see the finished work before he would commit to buying it. It would take Nesbitt about eight weeks to create a finished etching plate and it was financially devastating  for the artist when an image was not approved. A sixth image by Nesbitt, Streetcar was not purchased by AAA.  

A number of illustrations of Jackson Lee Nesbitt's work appeared in Art for Every Home, AAA 1934-2000, Nesbitt's 1942 painting of Apple Pickers that had appeared on the cover of Country Gentleman was reproduced on p.40.  His etching, November Evening is illustrated on page 40 and the 1947 egg tempura, Farm Auction, Jackson County is fully reproduced on p.144. and a full page illustration of a detail of that painting is on p.120.

List of Museums with Jackson Lee Nesbitt's work in their collections  
Amon Carter Museum of Art
Ackland Art Museum

Addison Gallery of American Art

Albrecht-Kemper Art Museum, St. Joseph, MO

Albright-Knox Museum

Boston Public Library

Carnegie Museum of Art

Cleveland Museum of Art

Columbia Museum of Art

Columbus Museum of Art, Columbus, GA

Columbus Museum of Art, Columbus, OH

Farnsworth Art Museum

Georgetown University Art Collection, Washington DC

High Museum of Art

Kalamazoo institute of the Arts, Kalamazoo MI

Krannert Art Museum at U. of Illinois

Kresge Art Museum
Library of Congress

Mead Art Museum at Amherst College

Memphis Brooks Museum of Art

Minneapolis Institute of Art

Morris Museum of Art

Muscarelle Museum of Art

Muskegon Museum of Art

Nelson-Atkins Museum of Art

New Orleans Museum of Art

Philbrook Art Museum

Orlando Museum of Art

Smithsonian American Art Museum

Santa Barbara Museum of Art

Weisman Art Museum

Syracuse University Art Museum

Toledo Museum of Art

Wichita Falls Museum of Art, Wichita, TX

References

Sources
 Retif Earl and Salzer, Ann, Jackson Lee Nesbitt: The Graphic Work.    Stone And Press Galleries.  1993
 Under the Influence: The Students of Thomas Hart Benton.  Marianne Berardi. The Albrecht-Kemper Museum of Art. 1993
 The Artists Bluebook.  Lonnie Pierson Dunbar, editor. March 2005.
 Davenport's Art Reference. Ray Davenport. 2005.
 Who Was Who in American Art.  Peter Hastings Falk (editor). 1999
 Kansas City Regional Art.  Associated American Artists. New York. 1940
 American Prize Prints of the 20th Century. Albert Reese. American Artists Group. 1949
 Retif, Earl, Jackson Lee Nesbitt (1913-2008), Journal of the Print World, Spring 2008 p. 7
Kraeft, June and Norman, The Wonder of Work,Exhibition of prints about workers including 15 images by Jackson lee Nesbitt, January 1984
North, Bill and Goddard, Stephen, Rural American — Prints from the Collection of Steven Schmidt, Spencer Museum of Art, 1993, 
Craven,Thomas, Thomas Hart Benton , An American Phenomenon, Associated American Artists, 1938
Seaton, ElizabethJ., Myers, Jane, Windisch, Gail, Art for EverynHome, Associated American Artists, 1934-2000, Marianna Kistler Beach Museum of Art, Kansas State University, Manhattan, Kansas, Yale University Press, ISBN 9780300215793
Retif, Earl, Jackson Lee Nesbitt , Journal of the Print World, Winter 1990 p. 19

External links
 obituary

1913 births
2008 deaths
20th-century American painters
American male painters
21st-century American painters
Modern painters
Kansas City Art Institute alumni
20th-century American printmakers
20th-century American male artists